The brown leaffolder (Ochyrotica concursa) is a moth of the family Pterophoridae. It is known from Sri Lanka.

In the past it was also recorded from the Ryukyu Islands (Tokunoshima, Okinawa), as well as in Minamidaitōjima, Taiwan, China, the Philippines, India, the Moluccas and New Guinea, but research suggest these records are not related to this species.

The length of the forewings is 6–7 mm.

The larvae feed on Ipomoea batatas.

External links
Taxonomic And Biological Studies Of Pterophoridae Of Japan (Lepidoptera)

Ochyroticinae
Moths of Asia
Taxa named by Thomas de Grey, 6th Baron Walsingham
Moths described in 1891